Gaetano Koch (9 January 1849 – 14 May 1910) was an Italian architect.

Koch was born in Rome, where he made his name with several major works – Palazzo Koch, seat of the Banca d'Italia, and the two porticoed palazzi which form Piazza della Repubblica, and the central Piazza Vittorio.

His mark can also be seen in Rome's Palazzo Mengarini and Palazzo Margherita (the latter is now the American Embassy to Italy on Via Veneto).  He collaborated with others in the design of the Monument to Vittorio Emanuele II.

He also designed the decoration of the main hall of the Palazzo Comunale at Recanati.

References

Sources 
This page is a translation of its Italian equivalent.

1849 births
1910 deaths
19th-century Italian architects
20th-century Italian architects